1st Sem is a 2016 Filipino independent coming of age comedy-drama film directed and written by Dexter Hemedez and Allan Ibanez in their feature-film directorial debut. The film stars Lotlot de Leon and newcomer Darwin Yu. It is an official entry to the 2nd CineFilipino Film Festival.

The film's teaser trailer was released at YouTube on January 20, 2016.The film will be having its commercial release on April 26, 2017.

Plot
Maru Marasigan (Darwin Yu), a sixteen-year old incoming freshman from the province, leaves his hometown to study in one of the prestigious universities in Manila. He is accompanied by his mother Precy (Lotlot de Leon) as he goes to his dormitory.

But Precy cannot help but get emotional when she is about to leave him. Maru feels sad seeing his mother cry. This escalates after Maru spent his first night at the dorm feeling alone and very lonely. Maru then decides to pack his things and go back home. Precy is very shocked to see him in their kitchen early in the morning the following day.

Down on his knees, Maru pleads to Precy to allow him to study in a nearby college for he cannot afford to live miles away from his family. But Precy rejects Maru's request and tells him to go back to Manila instead. As Maru insists his decision and disobeys Precy, his relationship with his mother starts to fall apart.

Cast
Lotlot de Leon as Precy
Darwin Yu as Maru
Miguel Bagtas as Jairus
Allan Paule
Sebastian Vargas Jr.	
Karen Romualdez
Teri Lacayanga
Maddie Martinez
Sachie Yu as Michelle

Critical reception
Oggs Cruz from Rappler states in his review that "At first, 1st Sem seems like it is all about jokes and punch lines. As soon as all the noise and artifice die down, what's left is a tender coming-of-age tale that has its heart in the right place."

1st Sem won Best Debut Feature for directors Dexter Paglinawan Hemedez and Allan Michael Ibañez at the All Lights India International Film Festival. Lotlot de Leon, also won a special acting citation for her performance in the film.

1st Sem also won Gold Remi Award from the 50th Worldfest Houston International Film Festival. Lotlot de Leon also won Best Supporting Actress for the film.

The film also won awards in South Korea and Canada.

Awards

References

External links

Filipino-language films